The Quota Borda system or quota preference score is a voting system 
that was devised by the British philosopher Michael Dummett and first published in 1984 in his book, Voting Procedures, and again in his Principles of Electoral Reform.

If proportionality is required in a Borda count election, a quota element should be included into the counting procedure, which works best in multi-member constituencies of either 4 or 6 members. The threshold used is the Droop quota; in a single-seat constituency, the quota is an absolute majority, i.e., (50% + 1) of the valid vote; in a 2-seat constituency, it is (33% + 1); in a 3-seat, it's (25% + 1); and in a 4-seat, it is (20% + 1) of the valid vote.

The four-seat selection goes as follows;

Stage i) Any candidate gaining a quota of 1st preferences is elected.

Stage ii) Any pair of candidates gaining 2 quotas is elected. (A pair of candidates, Ms J and Mr M, say, gains 2 quotas when that number of voters vote either 'J-1, M-2' or 'M-1, J-2'.) If seats still remain to be filled, then, ignoring all those candidates who have already been elected;

Stage iii) Any pair of candidates gaining 1 quota gains 1 seat, and the seat is given to the candidate of that pair who has the higher Modified Borda Count score.

Stage iv) Any seats still remaining are given to those candidates with the highest Modified Borda Count scores.

See also
Borda count
Matrix vote

References

External links
On Dummett's 'Quota Borda System' Article by Markus Schulze.
Single Transferable Vote with Borda Elimination: A New Vote Counting System Article by Chris Geller.

Electoral system quotas